The flag of the Hudson's Bay Company is used to represent the Hudson's Bay Company. The flag varied over time. From July 21, 1682, to 1965, the flag consists of the Red Ensign with the letters "HBC" in the lower field. In 1970 the company used the flag that display the company's coat of arms. Currently the company flag is the banner form of the company logo.

History 
Following the incorporation of the Hudson's Bay Company in 1670, the company was granted permission on July 21, 1682, by the first governor of the company, Prince Rupert, to use a modified version of the Red Ensign on its forts and ships entering Hudson Strait. The canton have been changed twice. Between 1682 and 1707, the Flag of St. George was located in the canton before being replaced by the Flag of Great Britain. In 1801 this was replaced by the Flag of the United Kingdom following the 1801 Act of Union.

The flag shared the same design as the Flag of Ontario and the Flag of Manitoba in using the Red Ensign. The use of Red Ensign by the company was stopped in 1965 after the Maple Leaf Flag was introduced.

Prior to 1869 the flag was used as both the flag of Rupert's Land and the Hudson's Bay Company. After Rupert's Land was purchased by the government of Canada, the flag continued as the flag of the HBC. In 1970, the company flag was based on the Governor's standard bearing the company's coat of arms (in gold on white field), which adopted in 1779.

In the fall of 2012, the Hudson's Bay Company launched a re-design of both its corporate and retail logos, since then, the company flag is the same design as the company logo, which is the dark blue field and the letters "HBC" in the centre.

See also
 Flag of the Northwest Territories
 Flag of the British East India Company
 Flag of the British South Africa Company

References

External links
The Flags of Canada, by Alistair B. Fraser
Hudson's Bay Company Heritage FAQ

Flags of Canada
Red Ensigns
Hudson's Bay Company
Flags displaying animals